Popenguine-Ndayane is a small village on the shore of the Atlantic Ocean in Senegal, located 70 km south of Dakar, on the Petite Côte, in the department of M'Bour  in the region of Thiès Region. 
Since 2008, it brings together two localities, Popenguine and Ndayane.

History
Founded 350 years ago, the village was first called Poponguine. It became Popenguine an initiative of President Léopold Sédar Senghor, one of whose poems is called "Retour à Popenguine". The town is a favorite vacation spot for Senegal's heads of state.

In 2003, Wolimata Thiao mobilized a Collective of Women’s Groups for the Protection of Nature (COPRONAT). They are in partnership with local communities and the Senegalese government. COPRONAT brings together women's groups from eight different villages. They have been in charge of protecting the Popenguine Nature Reserve since 1996. They plant trees, manage erosion and waste, environmental education activities that invest in the communities.

In February 2021, the village of Popenguine Ndayane launched a local campaign in response to COVID. The campaign was led by Charles Ciss and the Citizen Solidarity Movement.  Young people of the village distributed thousands of masks, cleaning products, and health kits to Muslim and Christian religious leaders, women in charge of market management, community groups, neighborhoods, elderly, and vulnerable people.

Administration
Popenguine was part of the rural community of Diass. It was set up as a municipality in July 2008. The Popenguine Classified Forest and the Popenguine Nature Reserve are included in the municipal perimeter.

Popenguine is set up in common with Ndayane and Popenguine Serer, with the name “Popenguine-Ndayane”. The first mayor is Mamadou Mansour Thiandoum, elected on April 14, 2009 by a municipal council of 36 members.

Geography
The nearest towns are Santiaba, Keuri Kaw, Tiambokh, Poponguine Serere, Gamboulem and Tialane.

Dakar, the capital of Senegal, is 71 km away.

Population
In 2009, Popenguine-Ndayane had 12,000 inhabitants and more than 380 households. The predominant ethnic group is the Serer people. 
The languages spoken in the village are  Wolof, Sereer Safin, and French.

Notable Sites
 There is Sunday Mass at the Notre-Dame de la Délivrande. Originally a fishing and farming village, today it is known mainly as a place of Catholic pilgrimage Basilique Notre-Dame de la Délivrance.
 The Popenguine Nature Reserve was created in 1986 by the Nicolas Hulot Foundation.

Gallery

Notable People
 Ayi Kwei Armah, a noted Ghanaian novelist, lives in Popenguine. He is the founder of Ankh Publishing in Popenguine.

Personalities born in Popenguine 
Hyacinthe Thiandoum Cardinal-Archbishop of Dakar
Mamadou Diouf, former deputy and former civil administrator
Mamadou Mansour Thiandoum, Mayor of Popenguine

References

External links
1994 Movie Rocking Poponguine
Images Popenguine-Ndayane

Populated places in Thiès Region
Communes of Senegal
 
Populated coastal places in Senegal
Populated places in Dakar Region
Petite Côte